Shivji may refer to:

Shiva, a Hindu deity
 Issa G. Shivji (born 1946), Tanzanian author and academic
 Shiraz Shivji (born 1947), Tanzanian computer scientist

See also
 Shivaji (disambiguation)